The Roman Catholic Diocese of Koforidua is a diocese located in the city of Koforidua in the Ecclesiastical province of Accra in Ghana.

History
 July 6, 1992: Established as Diocese of Koforidua from the Diocese of Accra

Special churches
The Cathedral is St. George’s Cathedral in Koforidua.

Leadership
 Bishops of Koforidua (Roman rite)
 Bishop Charles G. Palmer-Buckle (July 6, 1992– March 30, 2005) appointed Archbishop of Accra
 Bishop Joseph Kwaku Afrifah-Agyekum (since April 12, 2006)

See also
Roman Catholicism in Ghana

Sources
 GCatholic.org
 Catholic Hierarchy

Roman Catholic dioceses in Ghana
Dioceses in Ghana
Christian organizations established in 1992
Roman Catholic dioceses and prelatures established in the 20th century
Roman Catholic Ecclesiastical Province of Accra